The Royal Netherlands Baseball and Softball Federation (KNBSB) is the national governing body of baseball in the Netherlands. Baseball is widely played in the Netherlands but has struggled to become a major spectator sport due to the dominance of soccer, in which the Netherlands has always been one of the leading nations. School-aged children are generally enouraged to play soccer rather than baseball.

The national major league in the Netherlands, the Honkbal Hoofdklasse, was established in 1922. Notable Dutch baseball players include Hensley Meulens, Robert Eenhoorn, Andruw Jones, and Didi Gregorius.

See also
Baseball in the Netherlands
Netherlands national baseball team
Netherlands women's national softball team
Baseball awards#Netherlands

References

1912 establishments in the Netherlands
Ned
Baseball in the Netherlands
Organisations based in the Netherlands with royal patronage
Sports organizations established in 1912
Softball organizations
Base
Softball in the Netherlands